Midlands 5 West (North) was a level 10 English Rugby Union league and level 5 of the Midlands League, that was made up of teams from the northern part of the West Midlands region including clubs from parts of Birmingham and the West Midlands, Shropshire, Staffordshire, Worcestershire and even Cheshire, with home and away matches played throughout the season.  Each year some of the clubs in this division took part in the RFU Junior Vase - a level 9-12 national competition. 

The league was formed in 2005 and was originally known as Midlands 6 West (North) prior to the Midlands league restructure at the end of the 2008-09 season. Promoted teams typically moved up to Midlands 4 West (North) and there was relegation due to it being one of the basement divisions for Midlands rugby.  Since the end of the 2018–19 season the league has been discontinued, with the majority of teams transferred to Midlands 5 West (South).

2018–19

Participating teams & locations

2017–18

Participating teams & locations

Participating Clubs 2016-17
Acton Nomads
Aldridge (relegated from Midlands 4 West (North))
Chaddesley Corbett
Greyhound
Market Drayton (relegated from Midlands 4 West (North))
Stourport
Tenbury
Warley

Participating Clubs 2015-16
Chaddesley Corbett	
Essington
Greyhound (relegated from Midlands 4 West (North))
Tenbury (relegated from Midlands 4 West (North))
St Leonards	
Stourport
Warley

Participating Clubs 2014-15
Aldridge
Birmingham Barbarians
Chaddesley Corbett	
Church Stretton
Essington	
St Leonards	
Stourport
Warley	(relegated from Midlands 4 West (North))
Whittington

Participating Clubs 2013-14
Aldridge
Birmingham Barbarians
Chaddesley Corbett
Essington
Rugeley
Stourport
Telford Hornets
Whittington

Participating clubs 2012–13
Aldridge
Birmingham Barbarians
Essington
Rugeley
St Leonards
Stourport
Warley
Whittington

Participating clubs 2010–11
Aldridge
Birmingham Civil Service
Bromyard  
Five Ways Old Edwardians
Hanford  
Old Griffinians
Stourport
Tenbury
Wheaton Aston
Whittington

Original teams

When this division was introduced in 2005 as Midlands 6 West (North) it contained the following teams:

Barton-under-Needwood - transferred from Staffordshire 2 (3rd)
Eccleshall - transferred from Staffordshire 2 (8th)
Gnosall - transferred from Staffordshire 2 (9th)
Hanford - transferred from Staffordshire 2 (8th)
Market Drayton - transferred from Staffordshire 2 (6th)
Rugley - transferred from Staffordshire 2 (7th)
St Leonards - transferred from Staffordshire 2 (runners up)
Stone - transferred from Staffordshire 2 (4th)
Wheaton Aston & Penkridge - transferred from Staffordshire 2 (11th)
Whittington - transferred from Staffordshire 2 (5th)

Midlands 5 West (North) honours

Midlands 6 West (North) (2005–2009)

Midlands 6 West (North) was introduced ahead of the 2005–06 season as a tier 10 league to replace the discontinued North Midlands (North) and Staffordshire 1 leagues.  Promotion was to Midlands 5 West (North) and there was no relegation.

Midlands 5 West (North) (2009–2019)

Further league restructuring by the RFU meant that Midlands 6 West (North) and their counterparts Midlands 6 West (South-East / South-West)  were renamed as Midlands 5 West North and Midlands 5 West (South-East) and Midlands 5 West (South-West), with all leagues remaining at tier 10.  Promotion was now to Midlands 4 West (North) (formerly Midlands 5 West (North)) and there was no relegation.  At the end of 2018–19 season Midlands 5 West (North) was cancelled.

Number of league titles

Tenbury (3)
Essington (2)
St Leonards (2)
Barton-Under-Needwood (1)
Bromyard (1)
Church Stretton (1)
Greyhound (1)
Handsworth (1)
Market Drayton (1)
Rugeley (1)

Notes

See also
Midlands RFU
North Midlands RFU
Staffordshire RU
English rugby union system
Rugby union in England

References

6